is a Japanese light novel series and tabletop role-playing game written by Ryo Mizuno and illustrated by Miyū. Fujimi Shobo have published it in ten volumes from 2013 to 2018 under their Fujimi Fantasia Bunko imprint. A manga adaptation of the first 2 light novels with art by Makoto Yotsuba was serialized from June 2016 to June 2018 in Hakusensha's seinen manga magazine Young Animal. It has been collected in seven tankōbon volumes. An anime television series adaptation by A-1 Pictures aired from January 6 to June 23, 2018. A strategy video game for the PlayStation 4 was published on June 14, 2018.

Plot
Once upon a time, the world was ruled by Chaos. Chaos is one of many features of this mysterious world. Its concentration distorts the laws of nature, which leads to the emergence of demons and natural disasters, which people call "the scourge of Chaos." Then came "a man with a holy seal" and "returned the order." He was called the Lord. He was the only one who could use the seal and therefore protected people from Chaos. As a result of his actions, the territories occupied by people expanded instantly. So the Lord must be. But, everything has its own good and bad side. When the level of Chaos has gone down, the Crests have become instruments used in power struggles. At the moment, all people are divided between the Fantasia Union and the Factory Alliance.

Over time, the two power blocs' rulers decided to arrange the wedding of their heirs to unite and complete the creation of the Great Seal - a symbol of order for the eternal peace. However, both dukes were eliminated, and wars were unleashed on their territories with new forces. At the center of this battle was a student from the Magical Academy named Siluca, on which the earl named Lord Villar laid his eyes. The purpose of Siluca was to conclude an agreement with Villar, and on the way to Altirk (where Villar ruled), she was surrounded by hostile soldiers, but Lord Theo came to her aid. And they begin their adventures.

Characters

 Theo possesses a crest (which signifies nobility and gives superhuman powers) he received through defeating a monster, whereas normally one has to get one through transfer from another crest-holder. He has an idea to bring peace to the land, which Siluca vows to support him in achieving. While Theo and Siluca took a trip through a forest, they took shelter from the rain, where he conveyed his feelings to her. He would later become leader of the Altirk Treaty, then ascend as Emperor when the Factory Alliance and the Fantasia Union was unified with the engagement of their leaders. In the three years following the unification, he would marry Siluca and abdicate the throne in favor of Alexis Doucet so that he and Siluca would return to his homeland.

 Siluca is a 17-year-old mage that has large amounts of talent, and wishes to stop the feuding of lords. She is the first to contact Theo, and possesses a cat familiar that is the king of the cat kingdom, and can travel through shadows. On a trip through a forest Theo conveys his feelings to her, while taking shelter from the rain, and she reciprocates. With Theo's rise as emperor, she becomes the Imperial Mage Leader and marries him. After Theo abdicates the throne to Alexis, he and Siluca return to his homeland.

A demon seal holder, which basically is a seal that gives him extreme fighting capabilities. He is also one of the strongest ones, holding the title of Chamberlain, being one of the guards to the Archdukes (the highest level of crest-holders). His movements are usually un-seeable to the untrained eye. He becomes Siluca's guard after realizing her abilities when she was the only one who recognized danger from the Chaos that killed the two Archdukes.

A friend of Siluca's, and also a demon seal holder, as well as a top-class fighter. She exhibits perverted and mild psychopathic traits at times. She supports Siluca in her quest for peace, though, upon Pandora's orders, nearly killed her and Theo. However her Pandora's seal since then been eradicated and she fully supports Siluca and Theo.

A former crest-holder and lord of a country next to Theo's. After being defeated by him. He chooses to serve him and transfer his goal of conquering all nations to Theo, as he believes Theo has the power to do it.

A mage in the service of Lassic and a former upperclassman to Siluca in the mage academy. He is one of the only mages to be proficient in swordsmanship as well, because he believes that mages now need to fight on the front lines too. With this, he is able to overpower Siluca.

A priestess of the religious Order of the Crest. She has the same family name as the late pope. Priscilla expresses her hope that she can help Lord Theo with, what she sees as, his "divine battle to subdue Chaos". She has a 3-dimensional crest called The Holy Grail that she uses to heal people. When Siluca starts to voice a possible family connection, Priscilla politely silences her. She was later killed by the current Pope of the Order of the Crest who was working under the influence of Pandora.

The Margrave who became in charge of the Factory Alliance after her father, the archduke, was killed along with the archduke of the Fantasia Union on her wedding day (later known as The Great Hall Tragedy). While she is still in love with Alexis Doucet, the political tensions between the Alliance and the Union has made it impossible to talk with Alexis in a peaceful setting. In addition, her vow to honor her father's memory as leader of the Alliance has set her down the warpath out of honor; making her believe that her love for Alexis is impossible to maintain, even surrendering her virginity to Mirza Kooches in order to gain him as an ally. She would, however, later be re-engaged to Alexis anyway, with help from Theo and the Altirk Treaty, to unify the Alliance and the Union. Three years later, Theo, Siluca, Alexis, and Marrine have a double wedding, Marrine gave birth to twins and Theo abdicates the throne to Alexis so that he and Siluca may return to his hometown. With her husband's ascension as the Second Emperor of Leon, she becomes his chancellor.

The Mage Leader for the Factory Alliance and Siluca's adoptive father. He is the mage to Lady Marrine Kreische. Even though he loves Siluca, he always put his duty first over family.

The Earl of Altirk and Marrine's cousin despite being from the Fantasia Union. He is known as a lewd lord for having young female mages contracted to him--in actuality a ruse to protect these mages from those who fear their powers. He later releases them from their contract upon reaching the age of 25 to allow them to get married. He was the lord that Siluca was going to meet until she met Theo. He was killed at Castle Unicorn by Marrine's reinforcements after being betrayed by Mirza.

A 25 year-old lead female mage originally from Dartania that was contracted to Lord Villar Constance. She was an upperclassman to Siluca. She sacrificed her life for Villar from Marrine's army.

The murderous prince of Dartania, Altirk's neighboring small continent-nation across the sea. He is a friend of Lord Villar who has been traveling in secret for the last five years. He has no use of anyone that lacks ambition, especially for those that, in his eyes, gave it up, even his own soldiers. He was slain in battle by Theo.

The son of the late archduke of the Fantasia Union. An idealist and romanticist, he was to marry Marrine Kreische but The Great Hall Tragedy prevented it from happening. While he is deeply in love with Marrine and wishes to marry her, the disaster at their wedding and the political bickering had made it all but impossible to reach out to her. With the Altirk Treaty's intervention, however, he would later be engaged to Marrine to finally unify the Factory Alliance and the Fantasia Union. He later becomes the Second Emperor of Leon.

The Earl of Regalia, and a brother of Lord Villar, known as "The Fleeing Earl." He had a critical role in what led to the defeat of Milza and his powerful Dartanian contingent by Theo and the Treaty forces. He relinquished the Constance name in favor of his mother's surname and had his younger brother, Viscount Igor, continue the Constance family line.

Media

Light novels
The first light novel volume was published by Fujimi Shobo under their Fujimi Fantasia Bunko imprint on August 20, 2013 and the tenth and last on March 20, 2018. An additional volume dedicated to prologues and epilogues followed on September 20, 2018. 

A spin-off light novel titled , written by Ryo Mizuno and Notane Kaki and illustrated by Ayumu Kasuga, was published by Fujimi Shobo on September 20, 2013.

Tabletop role-playing game
In parallel to the light novel Ryo Mizuno and Shunsaku Yanō developed a tabletop role-playing game called Grancrest RPG. Two rulebooks were published on December 20, 2013 and January 18, 2014 with a supplement on September 19, 2015. Databooks with additional information and play styles followed on June 18, 2014 and March 19, 2015. Furthermore, more than a dozen replay books were published.

Anime
An anime adaptation of the light novel series was announced in October 2016, which was later confirmed to be a television series in May 2017. The anime series is directed by Shinichi Omata (under the pseudonym Mamoru Hatakeyama) at A-1 Pictures and written by WriteWorks, with series creator Ryō Mizuno and Shunsaku Yanō handled the series composition, Hiroshi Yakō designed the characters, Yoshikazu Iwanami handled the sound direction and Yugo Kanno composed the music. It aired from January 6, 2018 to June 23, 2018 on Tokyo MX and other networks. The series ran for 24 episodes. The first opening theme is "Starry" by Mashiro Ayano, and the ending theme is "Pledge" by Asca. Aniplex of America have licensed the series. The series was simulcast on AnimeLab in Australia and New Zealand. MVM Entertainment acquired the series for release in the United Kingdom and Ireland.

Notes

References

External links
 
 

2013 Japanese novels
A-1 Pictures
Android (operating system) games
Anime and manga based on light novels
Aniplex
Bandai Namco games
Fujimi Fantasia Bunko
Hakusensha manga
IOS games
Light novels
PlayStation 4 games
PlayStation 4-only games
Seinen manga
Viz Media manga